The North Vietnam V-League was the top level of association football in North Vietnam. It was founded in 1978.

Champions
 1955 - Câu lạc bộ Quân Đội
 1956 - Câu lạc bộ Quân Đội
 1957 - Công an Hải Phòng
 1958 - Câu lạc bộ Quân Đội
 1959 - Công an Hải Phòng
 1960 - Công an Hải Phòng
 1961 - Công an Hải Phòng
 1962 - Hà Nội FC (1956)
 1963 - Công an Hải Phòng
 1964 - Hà Nội FC (1956)
 1965 - Công an Hải Phòng
 1966 - Công an Hải Phòng
 1967 - Công an Hải Phòng
 1968 - Công an Hải Phòng
 1969 - Câu lạc bộ Quân Đội
 1970 - Công an Hải Phòng
 1979 - Câu lạc bộ Quân Đội

References

Football leagues in Vietnam
1978 establishments in Vietnam
Sports leagues established in 1978
Defunct top level football leagues in Asia